Dunkeld Bridge is a seven-arch bridge crossing the River Tay at Dunkeld, Perth and Kinross, Scotland. It carries the pedestrian and vehicle traffic of Bridge Street (the A923) and connects the parishes of Dunkeld and Dowally to the north and Little Dunkeld to the south. The pontage was abolished in 1879.

The bridge was built between 1805 and 1809 by Thomas Telford. It cost £33,978.

Gallery

See also
List of listed buildings in Dunkeld And Dowally, Perth and Kinross

References

Category A listed buildings in Perth and Kinross
Listed buildings in Dunkeld
Listed bridges in Scotland
Bridges across the River Tay
Bridges completed in 1809
1809 establishments in Scotland
Bridges in Perth and Kinross